Shahriar Alam may refer to:

 Shahriar Alam (cricketer), cricketer from Bangladesh
 Shahriar Alam (politician) (born 1970), Bangladesh politician